Aellen's pipistrelle (Pipistrellus inexspectatus) is a species of vesper bat. It can be found in possibly Benin, Cameroon, Ghana, Nigeria, and Sierra Leone. It is found in dry and moist savanna.

Taxonomy and etymology 
It was described as a new species in 1959 by V. Aellen. The species name "inexspectatus" is sometimes spelled as "inexpectatus," but this is incorrect. "Inexspectatus" is Latin for "unexpected."

Description
It weighs only . Its dorsal fur is dark brown, with individual hairs bicolored. Hairs are consistently colored on its ventral side. Its wing membranes are also dark brown; the posterior margins of the wings are whitish. The uropatagium is paler than the wing membranes. Its calcar is keeled, though almost imperceptibly.

Range and habitat
It is known from the Guinean forest-savanna mosaic in Sierra Leone, Ghana, Benin, Nigeria, and Cameroon.

Conservation
Aellen's pipistrelle is currently evaluated as data deficient by the IUCN because there is not enough information available to make an accurate conservation assessment.

References

Mammals described in 1959
Pipistrellus
Bats of Africa
Mammals of West Africa
Taxonomy articles created by Polbot